Neil Baldwin is a poet, critic, cultural historian, biographer, arts executive, and emeritus professor (as of July 1, 2020) in the College of the Arts at Montclair State University.

Early Life and Education
Neil Baldwin - a fourth-generation New Yorker – was born on June 21, 1947. The eldest of four sons of David S. Baldwin, MD (1921-2013), and Halee (Morris) Baldwin (1923-2017), he grew up on the Upper West Side of Manhattan, near Central Park, and went to neighborhood public schools. From 1961-1965, Baldwin attended the Horace Mann School in Riverdale, N.Y., where he wrote theatre, book and jazz reviews for the student newspaper, The Record; and was co-captain of the varsity cross-country, winter and spring track teams.

Baldwin began as a history major at the University of Rochester, N.Y., from 1965-1969, studying with Prof. Loren Baritz, author of City on a Hill, an early influence. He spent junior year abroad at the University of Manchester, England, writing his final term paper - “Order, Rhythm, and Cycle in James Joyce’s Portrait of the Artist as a Young Man, Ulysses, and Finnegans Wake” - under the aegis and tutelage of Prof. C.B.Cox, editor of Critical Quarterly.

He received a fellowship to teach undergraduate composition and literature while pursuing the PhD in Modern American Poetry at SUNY-Buffalo, with a minor in French literature, from 1969-1973. Baldwin’s mentors were poets Robert Creeley and John Logan; and Francophone scholars Raymond Federman and John Simon. His doctoral dissertation, compiled with the blessing and personal stewardship of James Laughlin, founder and publisher of New Directions, Inc., co-authored with Steven L. Meyers, and with a Preface by Creeley, was published in 1978 by G.K.Hall and Company - The Manuscripts and Letters of William Carlos Williams in the Poetry Collection, Lockwood Memorial Library, State University of New York at Buffalo: A Descriptive Catalogue. In addition to annotating Williams’s twenty thousand manuscripts – correspondence, poetry, fiction, nonfiction, drama, and the epic poem, Paterson - housed at Buffalo since the 1950s -- the volume includes Baldwin’s itemization of the Williams holdings at the Yale University Beinecke Rare Book and Manuscripts Library.

Baldwin’s first published essay, “William Carlos Williams and Valery Larbaud: Toward a Dynamic Convergence,” appeared in American Literature [May, 1973]; and his first published poems, “Translations from the French Poetry of Rainer Maria Rilke,” were featured in the American Poetry Review [Jan-Feb 1973] while he was still in graduate school. His first administrative position, Associate Director of Community Programs at Lewiston (N.Y.) State Art Park, came soon thereafter. These art-and-work initiatives in literature and not-for-profit established the through-line for Baldwin’s career.

Mid-Career – melding the literary and not-for-profit worlds
Newly-minted scholars of Baldwin’s generation faced a prohibitive higher-education job market. Of necessity, during the early- through-mid 1970s, Baldwin diversified. After the stint at Art Park – while his wife, Roberta Plutzik, pursued her métier as an arts and entertainment critic for the Rochester Democrat & Chronicle and the Buffalo Courier-Express --  Baldwin was Western New York Coordinator for the New York State Poets in the Schools Program; in addition to travelling widely for rural and urban school poetry residencies, he conducted creative writing workshops in “non-traditional” settings – drug rehabilitation centers, prisons, senior citizen centers, hospitals, and settlement houses – supported by funding from the National Endowment for the Arts, and Poets & Writers, Inc. In 1974, he launched The Niagara Magazine, a periodical of contemporary poetry that he edited and published for eight years; its “spirit of place” inaugural issue was devoted to “Poets of Western New York and Ontario.” Baldwin’s first volume of poetry, The bared and bended arm, was published in letterpress by Tom Bridwell’s Salt-Works Press (Dennis, Massachusetts, 1974). 

After the Blizzard of 1977, the Baldwins departed Buffalo for Brooklyn Heights, where Neil Baldwin continued his multifaceted enterprises and Roberta joined the Bergen Record as Lifestyle Editor. He taught literature as an adjunct professor at Baruch College, CUNY Graduate Center, the New School, and Fordham University; founded Neil Baldwin Associates, a nonprofit consultancy; took administrative and development positions with Poets & Writers and Teachers & Writers Collaborative;  published two more volumes of poetry with Salt-Works Press - Seasons and On the Trail of Messages; and brought out The Poetry Writing Handbook (Scholastic, 1981), a teaching manual derived from his creative writing pedagogy for grades 4-12.  In 1984, Atheneum published (with a cover graced by a design of Harry Ford) Baldwin’s biography of William Carlos Williams, To All Gentleness, derived from his first-hand scholarly engagement with the doctor-poet (1883-1963) who was born, lived and died in Rutherford, N.J.  The Preface was by William Eric Williams, M.D.

The New York Public Library, under the visionary leadership of philanthropist Brooke Russell Astor, President Vartan Gregorian, and Chairman of the Board Andrew Heiskell, was on the cusp of an urgently-needed five-year $350 million capital campaign when Baldwin was hired as a proposal writer for the Development Office. His first assignment was to research and generate the rationale for corporate underwriting of the conversion of Room 315, The Public Catalog Room, from index file cards to computerization.   After a few months at an electric typewriter in a cubicle overlooking Bryant Park in the labyrinthine stacks, Baldwin was tapped by VP for Development and Public Affairs Gregory Long to take over the Office of Foundation Giving; and, soon thereafter, was named Manager of The Annual Fund for The Campaign for the Library, with a goal to raise $10 million per year in operating support.  In 1986, the Baldwins, with their two children, Nicholas, age seven, and Allegra, age five, moved to Montclair, New Jersey; soon thereafter, Roberta launched her career as a real estate agent.

By 1989, the Campaign successfully completed, Baldwin had produced a second biography, Man Ray: American Artist (Clarkson Potter), with the cooperation of the painter-photographer’s widow in Paris, Juliet Man Ray; and his niece, in Princeton, the photographer Naomi Savage. A 1997 documentary, directed by Mel Stuart, with a script by Baldwin based upon his book and narrated by Stockard Channing, Man Ray – Prophet of the Avant-Garde, was shown on WNET-13 American Masters, and nominated for an Emmy Award.

The National Book Foundation – creating an institution
When Vartan Gregorian departed the NYPL to take up the presidency of Brown University, the members of the Library management team went their separate ways. In the spring of 1989, after being interviewed by the executive committee of the board of the nascent National Book Foundation, sponsor of the prestigious National Book Awards, Baldwin was hired as the founding executive director, charged with rebuilding and rebranding the nearly-insolvent institution. Over the ensuing fourteen years at the helm, Baldwin, with a professional staff of five, governed by a generous and dedicated cadre of publishing executives, authors and philanthropic private citizens, raised more than $25 million and established a permanent endowment to ensure the future stewardship of the institution and its mission. The Poetry Award was reinstated; and the Young People’s Literature Award was created, adding to the Fiction and Nonfiction Awards. The Distinguished Contribution to American Letters Award was created, honoring, among others, for lifetime achievement -- Eudora Welty, Gwendolyn Brooks, David McCullough, Philip Roth, Stephen King, -- and Oprah Winfrey received the 50th anniversary National Book Awards Gold Medal in 1999, at a black-tie ceremonial banquet hosted by Steve Martin. Literacy and educational outreach programs enlisting National Book Award Finalists and Winners - National Book Month in October; American Voices, bringing authors to Native American reservations; the Summer Writing Camp, for talented NYC public high school students; and the Settlement House Program, in alliance with United Neighborhood Houses – ensured that the love of books and reading was promulgated to diverse, national constituencies.  

Immersed in his writing (as well as fundraising) lives, Baldwin forged ahead with a new biography of Thomas Edison (Hyperion, 1995), bringing the man into prominence, beyond his persona; Legends of the Plumed Serpent: Biography of a Mexican God (Public Affairs, 1999), a richly-illustrated study in anthropological mythology; and Henry Ford and the Jews: The Mass Production of Hate (Public Affairs, 2001), excavating the anti-Semitic pathologies of the iconic auto maker. Baldwin’s fact-based international thriller, The 25th Protocol (Washington House, Inc., 2010), was inspired by the conspiracy-driven Ford saga. 

In 2002, driven to take action in the wake of the 9/11 cataclysm, Baldwin received an advance from St. Martin’s Press for his next book, The American Revelation: Ten Ideals that Shaped Our Country from the Puritans to the Cold War (2005), that enabled him to move on from the National Book Foundation, and write full time for two years.

The academy beckons
Coming off a national book tour keenly desiring a collegial environment, Baldwin sent a copy of The American Revelation to Mary A. Papazian, dean of the College of Humanities and Social Sciences at Montclair State University, in his home town, on the chance there might be room for a seasoned scholar to enter the academic ranks. MSU President Susan Cole hired Baldwin as the Distinguished Visiting Professor in the Department of History. After teaching modern intellectual and American cultural history for the 2006-7 academic year, Baldwin was recruited by the Dean of the College of the Arts, Geoffrey Newman, who placed him in the Department of Theatre & Dance. Baldwin’s mandate, acknowledging his literary pedigree, was to develop and create an undergraduate Dramaturgy major.  Following upon this theme, the Dance Division approached Baldwin about bearing witness to rehearsals, technique and choreography classes; the result was another curricular invention --Danceaturgy, the first such course on a college campus.  After serving as dramaturg for Tom Stoppard’s Arcadia, and a new version of Homburg adapted and directed by Jorge Cachiero – both shows featuring set design by Baldwin’s colleague, Erhard Rom --  he shifted to training graduate and undergraduate students in the craft of assisting on department production teams; while, on the danceaturgy side, he created and taught critical and observational writing seminars for MFA and BFA dance majors, who hosted innovative “talkbacks” after fall and spring concerts. As a core faculty member of the BA/MA Theatre Studies Program, Baldwin continued to teach Theatre History, Play Script Interpretation, Dramaturgy, and Arts Administration; while, beyond the College of the Arts, he launched “The Entrepreneurial Imagination” in the School of Business; “Great Books and Ideas” in the Honors Program; and, in 2010, founded the virtual Creative Research Center - a capacious, multipaged web site foregrounding imaginative projects by students and faculty across the entire University, and presenting an annual interdisciplinary Symposium.

The visceral epiphany of Martha Graham
In the winter of 2008, Denise Vale, senior artistic associate of the Martha Graham Dance Company, arrived at the Montclair State University campus to set Graham’s classic “Steps in the Street” (1936) on the students. Vale invited Baldwin to sit in on the sessions, and he realized that -- after a lifetime devoted to writing books about wide-ranging aspects of American culture, industry, and innovation -- he had fortuitously landed upon the unexplored terrain that would consume his scholarly and creative energies for the coming decade and more, until his retirement from Montclair State University as Professor Emeritus in July, 2020.

One of the most important artistic forces of the twentieth century, Martha Graham (1894-1991) was the legendary American dancer and choreographer who upended dance, propelling the art form into the modern age, and whose profound and pioneering influence is still being felt today. Time magazine called her “the Dancer of the Century.” Her technique, used by dance companies throughout the world, became the first long-lasting alternative to the idiom of classical ballet. Her pioneering movements—powerful, dynamic, jagged, edgy, forthright—combined with her distinctive system of training, were the epitome of American modernism, performance as art. Her work continued to astonish and inspire for more than sixty years as she choreographed more than 180 works. At the heart of Graham’s work: movement that could express inner feeling. 

Seized by this mammoth idea, Baldwin broached it to Janet Eilber, artistic director of The Martha Graham Dance Company, who encouraged him to embark upon writing the first biography of the artist in three decades. This was not to be an “authorized” telling, however. Baldwin’s intention from the outset was to contextualize Graham within the vibrant literary, visual arts, and music sweeping through the American scene between the Wars. Here, the reader meets and come to know Graham, from her nineteenth-century Allegheny, Pennsylvania, childhood, to becoming the star of the Denishawn exotic ballets, and in 1926, at age thirty-two, founding her own company (the longest-running dance company in America). Baldwin writes of the company’s effulgence during the hothouse artistic explosion of New York City’s midcentury cultural scene; of Erick Hawkins, in 1936, fresh from Balanchine’s School of American Ballet, a handsome Midwesterner fourteen years her junior, becoming Graham’s muse, lover, and eventual spouse. And of Graham inspiring the next generation of dancers, choreographers, and teachers, among them: Merce Cunningham and Paul Taylor.

Enriched by archival visual and audio riches of Martha Graham Resources, the Jerome Robbins Dance Division of the New York Public Library, the Library of Congress – as well as intimate interviews, on tape and in person, with vintage Graham dancers and stars of the present, and hours of eyewitness sojourns in the Company’s vast rehearsal studio in lower Manhattan, Baldwin’s story evolved exponentially, to embrace a large, fiercely lived life, beset by conflict, competition, and loneliness—filled with fire and inspiration, drive, passion, dedication, and sacrifice in work and in dance creation. Martha Graham – When Dance Became Modern was published by Alfred A. Knopf on October 25, 2022, to widespread critical acclaim.

Currently, Neil Baldwin is travelling and speaking about Martha Graham; danceaturging for the Sokolow/Theatre Dance Ensemble; arranging his poetic and literary archives for deaccession; keeping several writing projects moving in his journal; and serving as Critic-in-Residence for The Blended Campus.

Themes in writings
Baldwin describes a common thread in some of his work as follows:

"...my first two subjects were William Carlos Williams, the poet and physician and probably, you could say, the precursor of--of modern poetry in America today. And the second subject was Man Ray, who was the photographer and painter who was also a great American figure. And I viewed Man Ray as a quintessential modernist figure. And what I did was if--William Carlos Williams, I was talking about a genre and the history of a genre. And then I decided the most important thing after that would be to try to define a period as a whole, the modern period as a whole, so Man Ray to me was the metaphor for the modernist period in art."

"And then I thought, 'Well, I've dealt with two highly creative individuals, and I've explored their imaginations.' But I wanted to make the point that creativity and imagination are not the sole province of the artist, the--the humanist thinker. I wanted to show that invention, which was actually defined as an art in Edison's time--it was actually called the art of invention. I wanted to show that the inventive process, the creative process, they all stem from the--the--the deepest core of the imagination in--in a human being, and I wanted to connect all those creative processes in the context of an American vision."

"And if you look at the time frame for these three books--William Carlos Williams, Man Ray, Thomas Edison--they all begin sort of in the last vestiges of the industrial era and the romantic era in culture and they pass through the cataclysm of the wars and they end up sort of on the threshold of--of our day. And so I do think they all connect, even though on first blush it is--it's hard to see the connection, but I think there is a connection."

Bibliography

References

External links

Baldwin's blog as Director of Creative Research Center, Montclair State University

Living people
Year of birth missing (living people)
American male writers
University of Rochester alumni
University at Buffalo alumni
Montclair State University faculty